This article discusses the conjugation of verbs in a number of varieties of Catalan, including Old Catalan. Each verbal form is accompanied by its phonetic transcription. Widely used dialectal forms are included, even if they are not considered standard in either of the written norms: those of the Institut d'Estudis Catalans (based on central Catalan) and the Acadèmia Valenciana de la Llengua (based on common Valencian). Other dialectal forms exist, including those characteristic of minor dialects such as Ribagorçan and Algherese and transitional forms of major dialects (such as those spoken in the lower Ebro basin area around Tortosa and in the Empordà).

Verb system in context

The Catalan verb system has grammatical categories similar to those of neighbouring Romance languages such as Spanish, Occitan, French, and Italian. The formal similarities with Occitan are most noticeable. There is a visible divergence between Catalan and Occitan in Catalan second-person plural endings: -au, -eu, -iu, instead of the Occitan -atz, -etz, -itz.

One feature of Catalan is the periphrastic preterite tense for referring to the remote past, which is constructed with characteristic present-tense forms of the verb anar (to go) and the infinitive of a verb (vaig parlar, vas/vares parlar, va parlar, vam/vàrem parlar, vau/vàreu parlar, van/varen parlar). This tense, rare in Romance languages and shared  only with some Gascon and Aragonese (Benasque, Gistaín) dialects, seems to have existed in Catalan since at least the 13th century.

The simple preterite indicative, descending from the Latin perfect indicative, is primarily used in contemporary written Catalan. Although it has been largely replaced by the periphrastic preterite in the spoken language, the simple preterite indicative is still used in dialects such as central Valencian and the Catalan spoken on Ibiza.

Another difference between contemporary and Old Catalan is the shift in simple preterite indicative endings from an etymological to an analogous pattern in third-person plural: from the Old Catalan -é, -ast, -à, -am, -às, and -aren to the contemporary -í, -ares, -à, -àrem, -àreu, and -aren. This change occurred between the 13th and 15th centuries.

Forms

Finite

The table below summarises the inflected forms.

Finite Catalan verbs have an imperfective or perfective aspect.

Regular Catalan verbs have the following imperfective tenses:
 Simple present (present d'indicatiu), e.g. parlo ("I speak, I'm speaking")
 Imperfect preterite (pretèrit imperfet d'indicatiu), e.g. parlava ("I spoke, I was speaking")
 Simple future (futur simple), e.g. parlaré ("I will speak, I will be speaking")
 Simple conditional (condicional simple), e.g. parlaria ("I would speak, I would be speaking")
 Subjunctive simple present (present de subjuntiu), e.g. parli ("that I speak, me to speak")
 Subjunctive simple preterite (pretèrit imperfet de subjuntiu), e.g. parlés ("that I spoke")

Tenses in the subjunctive mood usually imply dependence on a subordinate clause and might express uncertainty or supposition.

Regular Catalan verbs have the following perfective tenses (formed with the auxiliary verb haver and the past participle of the conjugated verb), which correspond with those above:
 Indefinite preterite (pretèrit indefinit) (recent past, cf. English present perfect), e.g. he parlat ("I have spoken")
 Pluperfect (pretèrit plusquamperfet d'indicatiu) (cf. English past perfect), e.g. havia parlat ("I had spoken")
 Future perfect (futur compost), e.g. hauré parlat ("I will have spoken")
 Past conditional (condicional compost), e.g. hauria parlat ("I would have spoken")
 Subjunctive preterite perfect (pretèrit perfet de subjuntiu), e.g. hagi parlat ("that I have spoken, me to have spoken")
 Subjunctive pluperfect (pretèrit plusquamperfet de subjuntiu), e.g. hagués parlat ("that I had spoken")

The perfective tense in the indicative mood has two remote-past forms, analogous to the English simple past. The more common is the periphrastic preterite (pretèrit perfet perifràstic), a compound tense formed with conjugations of a special present indicative of anar ("go", used exclusively in the formation of this tense) followed by the infinitive of the conjugated verb (vaig parlar, "I spoke"; vas parlar or vares parlar, "you [singular informal] spoke"). This special form of anar always uses the stem va- and can also use the affix -re- when the regular preterite suffix corresponding to the desired person has it. As a consequence of always using va-, vau/vàreu and vam/vàrem are used to form the periphrastic past, instead of aneu and anem. The periphrastic preterite may also be used in the subjunctive mood, but this only occurs as a literary tense and sporadically in any case; instead, the simple past subjunctive is normally used. The normative Central Catalan and Valencian forms of anar used to form this tense are outlined in the table below.

The other tense expressing the remote past is the simple preterite (pretèrit perfet simple), now used almost exclusively in writing: parlí ("I spoke"), parlares ("you (singular informal) spoke").

The imperative present (present d'imperatiu), with two forms, exists outside the imperfective–perfective contrast: one for second-person singular and the other for second-person plural (parla!, "you [singular] speak!"; parleu!, "you [plural] speak!"). For other persons, the subjunctive present is used: parli! ("let him/her speak!"), parlem! ("let us speak!"), parlin! ("let them speak!"). The imperative is used for positive commands; negative commands use the present subjunctive preceded by no: no parlis! ("don't (you) (singular informal) speak!"), no parlem! ("let us not speak!"), no parleu! ("don't (you) (plural) speak!").

The differences in meaning and usage distribution of the Catalan recent past (indefinite preterite or present perfect) and remote past (periphrastic past and synthetic preterite) are similar to those of the British English present perfect and simple past. Using the recent past implies that the action was performed sometime in the past, completed during the period of speech and its effects are still present; the remote past implies that action was performed in the past and its effects are no longer present.

In conditional clauses, verb tenses are used in these pairs:
 Subordinate clause with subjunctive perfect preterite and main clause with perfect conditional to express a condition which did not happen: si hagués arribat abans, l'hauria trobat a casa ("if I had arrived earlier, I would have met him at home")
 Subordinate clause with subjunctive imperfect preterite and main clause with simple conditional to express an unreal condition in the present or the future: si l'estimés no se n'aniria ("if he loved her, he would not leave")
 Subordinate clause with indicative present and main clause with simple future to express a possible condition in the present or the future: si fas bondat, anirem al parc ("if you behave, we will go to the park")

Other tense combinations are also possible: si heu vist el que ha passat, ens ho heu d'explicar ("if you have seen what has happened, you must tell us"). Temporary and relative subordinate clauses are formed in the future tense: quan vindràs, en parlarem ("when you will come, we will speak about it"), els qui vindran d'hora podran seure ("those arriving early will be able to sit"); though, in the contemporary language, the present subjunctive is used as well, quan vinguis ... ("when you come ..."), els qui vinguin ... ("those who come ...").

Non-finite

Catalan verbs have three non-finite forms: an infinitive, a gerund, and a past participle.

The infinitive is used with present-indicative forms of anar (to go) to form the periphrastic preterite: vaig parlar ("I spoke"). A gerund, which is unvarying, functions as an adverb; it is used to form non-finite adjunct adverbial clauses of time or manner, roughly corresponding to the present participle in English.

The past participle, a verbal adjective, may inflect for gender and number in certain constructions. It is used with the auxiliary haver ("to have") to form the perfect of the simple tenses: simple present parlo ("I speak, I'm speaking") and present perfect he parlat ("I've spoken"). In the compound perfect tenses of transitive verbs (those with a direct object), a past participle may inflect to match gender and number of the object.

In Old Catalan and some modern varieties the compound perfect tenses of intransitive verbs (those without a direct object) can also be formed with the auxiliary ser ("to be") and the past participle, inflected for gender and number of the subject: som arribats ("we have arrived", switching to masculine plural); the typical contemporary construction is hem arribat, with an invariable participle. This construction remains in only a few vestigial forms: és mort/és morta ("he's dead/she's dead").

Periphrastic finite

Infinitives can be used to make the periphrastic near future with the present of anar (to go) plus the preposition a (to): vaig a parlar ("I am going to speak"). This near future is used less often than it is in Spanish or French, because it may be confused with the Catalan periphrastic past. Infinitives can also be used to make periphrastic forms with a range of modal verbs: puc parlar ("I can speak"), he/haig de parlar ("I must/have to speak"), necessito parlar ("I need to speak"), vull parlar ("I want to speak"), solia parlar ("I used to speak"). Gerunds can be used to make periphrastic forms analogous to continuous tenses in English: estic parlant ("I'm speaking"), estava parlant ("I was speaking"), estaré parlant ("I will be speaking"). Past participles are also used with the auxiliary ser ("to be") to form the passive forms for all active tenses of transitive verbs: active present veig ("I see, I'm seeing") in relation to passive present sóc vist ("I'm seen, I'm being seen"), recent past he vist ("I've seen") in relation to passive recent past he estat vist ("I've been seen").

Catalan uses the passive voice less often than English does because it has syntactic alternatives; instead of la vaca ha estat vista ("the cow has been seen"), other constructions could be used such as changing word order and using a redundant weak pronoun to mark object case: la vaca, l'han vista ("the cow, [they] have seen it"); using the third-person reflexive weak pronoun es (s'ha vist la vaca, literally "the cow has seen itself"); using the pronoun hom, one or someone (hom ha vist la vaca, "one has seen the cow"), or using an elliptic plural subject (han vist la vaca, "they have seen the cow").

First-conjugation (-ar) verbs

About 86 percent of Catalan verbs belong to this group. Examples include estimar ("to love"), esperar ("to wait" and "to hope"), menjar ("to eat") and pensar ("to think"). This is the only open verb class; new verbs incorporated into the language are likely to follow this conjugation model. The only irregular verbs in this class are the idiosyncratic anar ("to go") and estar ("to be, to stay"), which often act as auxiliary verbs.

parlar ("to speak")

Second-conjugation (-re, -er) verbs

This is the third-largest group of verbs in Catalan, encompassing about four percent of the verbs in the dictionary. It includes most of the irregular verbs, the most-frequently-used: ser ("to be"), haver ("to have"), fer ("to do"), veure ("to see"), poder ("can"), voler ("to want"), caldre ("must"), dir ("to say") and dur ("to take/get").

In verbs whose infinitive ends in -re, the letter preceding -re is always a consonant (like b, d, p, t) or a diphthong ending in the letter u. Examples include beure ("to drink"), caure ("to fall"), coure ("to cook"), deure ("to owe", also modal "might"), fotre ("fuck"), jeure ("to lay down"), perdre ("to lose"), rebre ("to receive"), rompre ("break"), valdre ("to be worth"), vendre ("to sell"), and viure ("to live").

The final consonantal u in infinitive roots of this verb class is a characteristic Catalan evolution of several consonantal clusters from Vulgar Latin: CÁDERE > *cad're > caure, DÉBERE > *dev're > deure, VÍVERE > *viv're > viure, CÓQUERE > *cog're > coure. The clusters -ldr-, -ndr- in infinitive roots of this verb class have an epenthetic d as the result of the evolution of consonantal clusters from Vulgar Latin: VÁLERE > val're > valdre, VÉNDERE > *ven're > vendre. If the root consonant in the infinitive is b, the third-person singular indicative present will be spelt with a p; rebre becomes rep.

Some verbs in this group have a suppletive root with a velar augment (adding -g-  or -c  to the basic root) in some forms, most frequently past participle, first person of indicative present, and all forms of indicative preterite, subjunctive present and subjunctive preterite: valdre gives valgut, valc, valguí, valgui, valgués; voler gives volgut, vull or vullc, volguí, vulgui, volgués.

batre ("to beat", "to shake")

Third-conjugation (-ir) verbs

This is the second-largest group of regular verbs in the Catalan language (about 10 percent of verbs in the dictionary). Most regular verbs in the group (about 91 percent) are inchoative, deriving from the Latin inchoative suffix -ESC-.

Two-stemmed inchoatives: servir ("to serve")

These verbs have basic (serv-) and extended stems (serveix-, servix-, servesc- or servisc-), used in particular tenses. Examples of inchoative verbs include patir ("to suffer/endure") and partir ("to divide"), which give the third-person singular indicative present of pateix and parteix respectively.

One-stemmed: dormir ("to sleep")

Examples of non-inchoative verbs include fugir ("to flee") and morir ("to die"), which give third-person singular indicative presents of fuig and mor respectively.

Irregular verbs

ser or ésser ("to be")

This auxiliary verb presents several different roots: s-, ess-, er-, sig- (from Latin ESSE), and for-, foss, fu- (from Latin perfect forms of ESSE, which had analogous suppletive roots).

haver ("to have")

This auxiliary verb has several different roots: h-, hav- and hag- (either  or ) (all from Latin HABERE). There are more dialectal forms with a velar augment based on the root hag-.

anar ("to go")

Anar has two roots: ana-, ani- (from Latin AMBULARE, the second a mix with Latin IRE) and va-, vag-  (from Latin VADERE). The present of anar is used as an auxiliary verb to form the periphrastic preterite with the infinitive of the verb being conjugated. The forms of anar as an auxiliary verb are slightly different from the normal present tense. The first- and second-person plural forms are different; the auxiliary verb forms are vam and vau (or vem and veu, depending on dialect), and the full verb forms are anem and aneu (or anam and anau, depending on dialect).

fer ("to do")

This irregular verb presents several different roots: fe-, fa-, fac-  (from the Latin FACERE). There are more dialectal (and non-standard) forms based on the root fag- , similar to haver (for example, in the central Catalan subjunctive present).

dir ("to say") 

This irregular verb presents several different roots: di-, diu- , dei- , dig- , dic-  (all from Latin DICERE). There are more dialectal forms with a velar augment based on the root dig-, especially in the Balearic dialects.

dur ("to take/get")

This irregular verb has several different roots: du-, dui- , dug- , duc-  (all from Latin DUCERE). There are more dialectal forms with a velar augment based on the root dug-, especially in the Balearic dialects.

Online Catalan verb conjugators
 Catalan Conjugator. CatalanDictionary.org
 Romance languages: Catalan - verbix.com
 Catalan verb conjugations and exercises - verbs.cat

See also
Catalan phonology
Romance verbs
Occitan conjugation

Notes

Bibliography
 Proposta per a un estandàrd oral de la llengua catalana, II – Morfologia / Institut d'Estudis Catalans. Secció filològica – 1999
 Gramática histórica catalana / Antoni Maria Badia i Margarit – Tres i quatre, 1994
 Moments clau de la història de la llengua catalana / Antoni Maria Badia i Margarit – Universitat de València, 2004
 Gramàtica històrica catalana / Francesc de Borja i Moll – Universitat de València, 2006
 Morfologia catalana / Manuel Pérez Saldanya (coord.) – UOC, 2001
 Els Parlars catalans : síntesi de dialectologia / Joan Veny i Clar – Moll, 1982
 Els verbs catalans conjugats / Joan Baptista Xuriguera i Parramona – Claret, 1972

Catalan grammar
Indo-European verbs